Douw Calitz (born 30 December 1974) is a South African born international lawn bowls player from Namibia who was the 2003 World Singles Champion of Champions.

Bowls career

World Championships
Calitz has competed for Namibia at five World Bowls Championships in 1996 and 2004, 2008, 2012 and 2016.

Commonwealth Games
Calitz has represented Namibia at six Commonwealth Games in 1994, 1998, 2002, 2006, 2014 and 2018. This constitutes a record number of appearances for Namibia at the Commonwealth Games.

Other events
In 2003 he became the World Singles Champion of Champions defeating Darren Burnett of Scotland in the final.

References

External links
  (1994–2014)
 
 
 

1974 births
Living people
Namibian bowls players
Commonwealth Games competitors for Namibia
Bowls players at the 1994 Commonwealth Games
Bowls players at the 1998 Commonwealth Games
Bowls players at the 2002 Commonwealth Games
Bowls players at the 2006 Commonwealth Games
Bowls players at the 2014 Commonwealth Games
Bowls players at the 2018 Commonwealth Games